The Winnipeg Jets were a professional ice hockey team based in Winnipeg. They began play in the World Hockey Association (WHA) in 1972. The club joined the National Hockey League (NHL) in 1979 after the NHL merged with the WHA. Due to mounting financial troubles, in 1996 the franchise moved to Phoenix, Arizona and became the Phoenix Coyotes (now the Arizona Coyotes). The team played their home games at Winnipeg Arena.

Franchise history

The WHA years (1972–1979)
On December 27, 1971, Winnipeg was granted one of the founding franchises in the WHA. The original owner was Ben Hatskin, a local figure who made his wealth in cardboard shipping containers. The team took their name from the Winnipeg Jets of the Western Canada Hockey League.

The Jets' first signing was Norm Beaudin (earning the player the moniker of "the Original Jet"), while the first major signing was Bobby Hull. Hull's acquisition, partially financed by the rest of the WHA's teams, gave the league instant credibility and paved the way for other NHL stars to bolt to the upstart league.

The Jets were the first North American club to seriously explore Europe as a source of hockey talent. Winnipeg's fortunes were bolstered by acquisitions such as Swedish forwards Anders Hedberg and Ulf Nilsson, who starred with Hull on the WHA's most famous and successful forward line (nicknamed "the Hot Line"), and defenceman Lars-Erik Sjoberg, who would serve as the team's captain and win accolades as the WHA's best defenceman. Behind these players and other European stars such as Willy Lindstrom, Kent Nilsson, Veli-Pekka Ketola, leavened by players such as Peter Sullivan, Norm Beaudin and goaltender Joe Daley, the Jets were the most successful team in the short-lived WHA. The team made the finals in five of the WHA's seven seasons, winning the Avco World Trophy three times, including in the league's final season against Wayne Gretzky and the Edmonton Oilers.

Another notable accomplishment was the Jets' 5–3 victory over the Soviet National team on January 5, 1978.

In the WHA's last season, Kent Nilsson scored 107 points, while Morris Lukowich had 65 goals, and Peter Sullivan had 46 goals and 86 points. During the Avco Cup Finals, Gary Smith gave up the last goal in WHA history to Dave Semenko in a 7–3 Jets win.

Career leaders (WHA)
 Games: Bobby Hull, 411
 Goals: Bobby Hull, 303
 Assists: Ulf Nilsson, 344
 Points: Bobby Hull, 638
 Penalty Minutes: Kim Clackson, 413
 Goaltending Wins: Joe Daley, 167
 Shutouts: Joe Daley, 12

The 1976, 1978 and 1979 Avco Cup winning Winnipeg Jets were inducted into the Manitoba Hockey Hall of Fame in the team category.

The NHL years (1979–1996)

By 1978–79, the vast majority of the WHA's teams had folded, but the Jets were still going strong. After the season, the Jets were absorbed into the NHL along with the Nordiques, Oilers and Hartford Whalers. Pre-merger inter-league exhibitions had shown that the 1978–79 WHA Jets were the competitive equal of most NHL teams, with the possible exceptions of the three-time defending Stanley Cup champion Montreal Canadiens and the rising New York Islanders.

However, the Jets had to pay a very high price for a berth in the more established league. They had to give up three of their top six scorers – the core of the last WHA champion – in a reclamation draft. They were also forced to draft 18th out of 21 teams. In the draft, they opted to protect defenceman Scott Campbell, who had shown a good deal of promise in the last WHA season. However, Campbell suffered from chronic asthma that was only exacerbated by Winnipeg's frigid weather. The asthma drove him out of the league entirely by 1982.

Upon entering the NHL, the Jets were based in the Smythe Division of the Campbell Conference. However, with a decimated roster, the Jets finished dead last in the league for their first two seasons in the NHL, including a horrendous nine-win season in 1980–81 that still ranks as the worst in Jets/Coyotes history. This stands in marked contrast to the other 1979 Avco Cup finalist, the Oilers, who went on to dominate the league during the second half of the 1980s.

The Jets' first two wretched NHL seasons did net them high draft picks; in the 1980 draft they picked Dave Babych second overall and in 1981 they drafted future Hall of Fame member Dale Hawerchuk first overall. The team developed a solid core of players by the mid-1980s, with Hawerchuk, Thomas Steen, Paul MacLean, Randy Carlyle, Laurie Boschman, Doug Smail, and David Ellett providing a strong nucleus. Also in 1981, a league-wide realignment placed the Jets with the league's other Central Time Zone teams in the Norris Division, which over the course of the decade would become the weakest division in the league.

Led by Hawerchuk, Steen, Babych and Carlyle, the Jets returned to respectability fairly quickly, and made the playoffs 11 times in the next 15 years. However, regular-season success did not transfer over into the playoffs. This was because after just one season in the Norris, the relocation of the Colorado Rockies to New Jersey compelled Winnipeg to return to the more competitive Smythe Division along with the Oilers and Calgary Flames – by some accounts, the two best teams in the league during the second half of the 1980s. Due to the way the playoffs were structured at the time, whenever the Jets made the playoffs, they faced the near-certainty of having to beat either the Oilers or the Flames (or both) to get to the Campbell Conference Finals. At the time, the top four teams in each division made the playoffs, with the regular-season division winner playing against the fourth-place team and the regular-season runner-up playing the third-place team in the division semifinals. The division semifinal winners advanced to the division finals, and the two division final winners would meet in the conference finals.

For example, in 1984–85, they finished with the fourth-best record in the entire league (behind only Philadelphia, Edmonton and Washington). They also notched 96 points, which would remain the franchise's best as an NHL team until the 2009–10 Coyotes racked up the franchise's second 100-point season (and first as an NHL team). However, they finished second in the Smythe behind the Oilers. While they managed to dispatch the Flames (with the league's fifth-best record) in four games in the best-of-five division semifinal, they were swept by the eventual Stanley Cup champion Oilers in the division final. In fact, Winnipeg and Edmonton played each other in the playoffs six times between 1983 and 1990. The Oilers not only won every series, but also held the Jets to only four total victories. Five times (1984, 1985, 1987, 1988, and 1990), the Oilers went on to win the Stanley Cup. The Jets won only one more playoff series, in 1987 (defeating Calgary in the division semifinal before losing to Edmonton in the division final). It was not until the 1993–94 season that further expansion and re-alignment permitted the original Jets to return to the re-branded Central Division (the former Norris Division) of the Western Conference. By this time however, the Central was at least the competitive equal of the re-named Pacific Division and the strict division-based playoff bracket had been abandoned.

Demise and relocation
As the NHL expanded in the United States and free agency rules were liberalized, operating costs and salaries grew rapidly; players had the leverage to demand being paid in U.S. dollars league-wide. Until about the early 1990s, Canadian teams were able to pay their players in Canadian dollars, with the exceptions being contracts acquired in trades from U.S. teams. However, since the Canadian teams still collected most of their revenue in Canadian dollars, having to pay players in U.S. dollars proved to be a serious drain on finances given the declining value of the Canadian dollar. For most of their NHL tenure, Winnipeg was the league's second-smallest market, and became the smallest market after the Quebec Nordiques moved to Denver as the Colorado Avalanche in 1995–96. Despite a loyal fan following, serious doubts were raised about whether Winnipeg could continue to support an NHL team. Additionally, their home arena, Winnipeg Arena, was over 40 years old, had no luxury suites, and numerous obstructed-view seats.

Attempts to find a local buyer were unsuccessful. After an 11th-hour effort by a local consortium failed to raise enough money, team owner Barry Shenkarow sold the team to American businessmen Steven Gluckstern and Richard Burke for $65 million. They planned to move the team to the Minneapolis-Saint Paul region (which had lost the North Stars to Dallas in 1993) but could not reach an agreement with the City of Minneapolis to share the Target Center with the NBA's Minnesota Timberwolves. With no suitable alternate venues in the Twin Cities area, the owners reached an agreement with Jerry Colangelo, owner of the NBA's Phoenix Suns, to move the team to Phoenix and become the Phoenix Coyotes. The Jets played their last game on April 28, 1996, a home playoff loss to the Detroit Red Wings by a score of 4–1. Norm Maciver scored the last goal in Jets history.

Winnipeg was not without hockey for long, however; the International Hockey League's Minnesota Moose moved to Winnipeg as the Manitoba Moose a few months after the Jets left town.

During their history, the Jets retired two numbers: Bobby Hull's #9 and Thomas Steen's #25. The Coyotes have continued to honor those numbers, and hang their banners in the Jets' old blue-red-white colour scheme. Dale Hawerchuk's No. 10 was added in 2006, in the Coyotes' current sand-red-black scheme. Another tradition that was retained when the franchise moved to Phoenix was the "whiteout", in which fans wore all white to home playoff games.

The Jets/Coyotes franchise finally broke its playoff series drought in 2011–12, a season in which they won their first division title as an NHL team (in Winnipeg or Phoenix) and advanced all the way to the Western Conference Final.

Shane Doan, drafted seventh overall by the Jets in the 1995 NHL Entry Draft prior to their last season in Winnipeg, and who played his rookie season in Winnipeg, was the last original Jet to still be active in the NHL (and to still be with the franchise) upon his retirement in 2017. The only other former original Jet playing professionally by that time was Deron Quint, who played in the German DEL in Germany until 2017.

Doan returned to the Coyotes in 2021 as head of hockey development. He and Arizona Coyotes equipment manager Stan Wilson, who joined the team while it was still in Winnipeg, are among the last members of the franchise with a direct connection to its past in Winnipeg.

The current Winnipeg Jets have acknowledged the original Jets' history on a number of occasions. The original franchise's division and Avco Cup championships currently hang atop the rafters of Canada Life Centre, as are the honoured numbers of the original Jets who were inducted into the current Jets' Hall of Fame. They have also worn throwback uniforms of the original Jets on a few occasions, and brought back the Whiteout tradition in the Stanley Cup playoffs. The new franchise acquired the trademarks to the name and logo of the original Jets from the NHL when it moved to Winnipeg – at the time, the league directly owned the Coyotes and thus controlled the Jets' trademarks. However, the franchise's records still belong to the Coyotes.

Before the 2021–22 season, the Coyotes moved from the Pacific to the Central Division to accommodate the expansion Seattle Kraken. As a result, the original Jets (Coyotes) and current Jets franchises became intradivisional opponents, playing three or four games per season.

Uniforms
The Jets debuted in the WHA wearing blue and white uniforms with red trim. White uniforms featured a blue shoulder yoke, blue numbers and blue-white-red-white-blue waist, sock and sleeve stripes. The blue uniforms were the inverse of their white counterparts minus the contrasting yoke and used red numbers. In the franchise's first season, the uniforms featured the futuristic "Jets" wordmark in front along with red or white player nameplates. Starting in 1974, the Jets donned their "classic" look, ditching the contrast-colour nameplates and unveiling their famous roundel logo. In 1977 the Jets added a white shoulder yoke on the blue uniform, and the following season, switched from red to blue pants.

Upon moving to the NHL in 1979, the Jets unveiled new uniforms. Then-general manager John Ferguson Sr. had been derided for changing the classic New York Rangers uniforms during the late 1970s, so he brought most elements of that design to the Jets. Both uniforms featured a thick shoulder stripe that extended through the sleeves, along with another thick stripe on the waist. In addition, the blue uniforms now featured white numbers with red trim and a white inverse of the team's logo in front. In 1987, the Jets added a "Goals for Kids" patch which remained a prominent figure on the uniforms until the relocation.

In 1990, the Jets unveiled their final uniform design, featuring the updated crest in front and contrasting sleeve and waist stripes. They also switched back to red pants.

The current incarnation of the Winnipeg Jets employs a different uniform design and logo, although they occasionally use the "old" Jets uniform as an alternate jersey. For the 2021 season, a "Reverse Retro" jersey was introduced in collaboration with Adidas. The jersey was designed to emulate the original Jets' 1979–90 look but used colors of the current Jets. Before the 2021–22 season, the blue WHA-era uniform the modern-day Jets wore in the 2019 Heritage Classic became the team's third jersey. A second "Reverse Retro" jersey, this time a recoloured version of the 1990–96 Jets white uniform, was released in the 2022–23 season.

Winnipeg White Out

The Winnipeg White Out is a hockey tradition that dates back to 1987 when fans were asked to wear white clothing to home playoff games, creating a very intimidating effect and atmosphere. It was created as a response to the "C of Red" created by fans of the Calgary Flames, whom the home-town Jets were facing in the first round of the 1987 Stanley Cup Playoffs. The Jets eliminated the Flames in six games, and fans wore white for every home playoff game thereafter. Fans dubbed it the "White Out" which is a prairie term for a winter snow storm. Marketing for the team during the playoff referred to the "charge of the white brigade." In later years, marketing referred to the White Out as "White Noise."

Fans of the AHL franchise Manitoba Moose also continued this tradition when the team briefly relocated to St. John's, Newfoundland, as the St. John's IceCaps, as did fans of the "IceCap's White Out" and "Coyotes White Out," respectively. When the Thrashers moved to Winnipeg as the second incarnation of the Jets, they brought back the White Out tradition for the 2015 and 2018 playoffs.

Season–by–season record
Note: GP = Games played, W = Wins, L = Losses, T = Ties, Pts = Points, GF = Goals for, GA = Goals against, PIM = Penalties minutes

WHA era

NHL era

Notes:
 1 Season was shortened by the 1994–95 NHL lockout

Notable players

Team captains
Note: This list includes Jets captains from both the NHL and WHA.

 Ab McDonald, 1972–1974
 Dan Johnson, 1974–1975
 Lars-Erik Sjoberg, 1975–1978, 1979–1980
 Barry Long, 1978–1979
 Morris Lukowich, 1980–1981
 Dave Christian, 1981–1982
 Lucien DeBlois, 1982–1984
 Dale Hawerchuk, 1984–1989
 Dale Hawerchuk, Thomas Steen and Randy Carlyle, 1989–1990  (tri-captains)
 Thomas Steen and Randy Carlyle, 1990–1991  (co-captains)
 Troy Murray, 1991–1993
 Dean Kennedy, 1993
 Keith Tkachuk, 1993–1995
 Kris King, 1995–1996

First round draft picks
Note: This list includes draft picks from both the NHL and WHA.

 1973: Ron Andruff (11th overall)
 1974: Randy Andreachuk (7th overall)
 1975: Brad Gassoff (8th overall)
 1976: Thomas Gradin (9th overall)
 1977: Ron Duguay (3rd overall)
 1978: no WHA draft
 1979: Jimmy Mann (19th overall)
 1980: Dave Babych (2nd overall)
 1981: Dale Hawerchuk (1st overall)
 1982: Jim Kyte (12th overall)
 1983: Andrew McBain (8th overall) and Bobby Dollas (14th overall)
 1984: none
 1985: Ryan Stewart (18th overall)
 1986: Pat Elynuik (8th overall)
 1987: Bryan Marchment (16th overall)
 1988: Teemu Selanne (10th overall)
 1989: Stu Barnes (4th overall)
 1990: Keith Tkachuk (19th overall)
 1991: Aaron Ward (5th overall)
 1992: Sergei Bautin (17th overall)
 1993: Mats Lindgren (15th overall)
 1994: none
 1995: Shane Doan (7th overall)

Hall of Famers
 Dale Hawerchuk, C, 1981–1990, inducted 2001
 Phil Housley, D, 1990–1993, inducted 2015
 Bobby Hull, LW, 1972–1980, inducted 1983
 Serge Savard, D, 1981–1983, inducted 1986
 Teemu Selanne, RW, 1992–1996, inducted 2017

Retired numbers
The original Winnipeg Jets retired two numbers in their history. When the Jets relocated to Arizona, the banners of these players also made the move, and these numbers originally remain retired with the Arizona Coyotes, in Jets' colors. Beginning with the 2014–15 season, those numbers were unretired and brought back to circulation; they were still inducted as part of the Arizona Coyotes Ring of Honor. After the move to Arizona, number 10 was inducted in honor of Dale Hawerchuk, number 7 was inducted for Keith Tkachuk, and number 27 was inducted for Teppo Numminen. Shane Doan's number 19 was the only number officially retired by the Coyotes.

The current Winnipeg Jets (formerly Atlanta Thrashers) also honoured both numbers in the Winnipeg Jets Hall of Fame.

Notes:
 1 Bobby Hull's number was temporarily unretired by the successor Coyotes franchise for Bobby's son Brett in the 2005–06 season before his son Brett retired five games into that season.

Franchise scoring leaders
These are the top-ten-point-scorers in Winnipeg Jets history, combining NHL and WHA totals.

Legend: Pos = Position; GP = Games played; G = Goals; A = Assists; Pts = Points; P/G = Points per game

Winnipeg Jets individual records

 Most goals in a season: Bobby Hull 77 (1974-75)
Most goals in a NHL season: Teemu Selanne, 76 (1992–93; NHL rookie record)
 Most assists in a season: Phil Housley, 79 (1992–93)
 Most points in a season: Bobby Hull 142 (1974-75)
Most points in a NHL season: Teemu Selanne 132 (1992–93; NHL rookie record)
 Most penalty minutes in a season: Tie Domi, 347 (1993–94)
 Most points in a season, defenceman: Phil Housley, 97 (1992–93)
 Most points in a season, rookie: Teemu Selanne, 132 (1992–93; NHL record)
 Most wins in a season: Joe Daley, 41 (1975-76)
 Most wins in a NHL season: Brian Hayward and Bob Essensa, 33 (1984–85 and 1992–93)

See also
List of Winnipeg Jets (1972–96) head coaches
Avco World Trophy
List of defunct NHL teams
List of ice hockey teams in Manitoba

References
Notes

Further reading
"City survived loss of Jets, but fans must do better", Winnipeg Free Press''

External links

Winnipeg Jets Online.com – Dedicated to the History and Memory of the Winnipeg Jets
WHAhockey.com – Winnipeg Jets
1976 Winnipeg Jets at Manitoba Hockey Hall of Fame
1978 Winnipeg Jets at Manitoba Hockey Hall of Fame
1979 Winnipeg Jets at Manitoba Hockey Hall of Fame

 
National Hockey League teams based in Canada
Ice hockey clubs established in 1972
Sports clubs disestablished in 1996
1972 establishments in Manitoba
1996 disestablishments in Manitoba
1972
National Hockey League in Manitoba
Defunct ice hockey teams in Canada
Defunct National Hockey League teams